is the eighth compilation album by Japanese entertainer Miho Nakayama. Released through King Records on December 18, 1996, the album features 15 ballads selected by Nakayama from her past releases. To coincide with the release of this album, the 1989 compilation Ballads was reissued on the same day with a new matching cover art.

The album peaked at No. 25 on Oricon's albums chart and sold over 41,000 copies.

Track listing

Charts

References

External links
 
 
 

1996 compilation albums
Miho Nakayama compilation albums
Japanese-language compilation albums
King Records (Japan) compilation albums